A changing bag is a photographic bag specifically designed to be light-proof while in use. It is required for certain applications involving photosensitive materials when a darkroom is not available, like in the field. Common usages include removing film from its canister to put it into a developing tank, or loading and unloading sheet film holders. They are also commonly found on the set of a film, where the clapper loader may need one if shooting on location or far away from a darkroom.

Usage
It is handy to use when a darkroom is not available as is often the case in field shooting.  It is also used in commercial photo processing labs, often to change paper.

Description
A changing bag has two sleeves at one end for both the user's arms, and a zipper (often more than one, for double layered changing bags) to insert the tools and film needed. There are several sizes available, from smaller ones for many still photography applications to larger bags used in large-format still photography or film making, which may need to hold both a magazine and a can of film stock which each have a 1000-foot capacity. Larger changing bag sizes are also available as "changing tents", where the top of the bag can be held in a dome-like configuration through the use of two curved rods.

Photography equipment
Bags